Lecithocera niptanensis is a moth in the family Lecithoceridae first described by Kyu-Tek Park in 2012. It is found in Indonesia (Irian Jaya) and Papua New Guinea.

Etymology
The species name is derived from one of the localities (Niptan District) of the type specimens.

References

Moths described in 2012
niptanensis